Esteban Valderrama Quiceno (born 15 August 1993), is a Colombian chess player. He was awarded the title of International Master by FIDE in 2018.

Career
He was the Colombian champion in rapid (2018) and blitz (2013, 2018).

He came 2nd in the 2020 Colombian Chess Championship.

He qualified for the Chess World Cup 2021 where he was defeated by Varuzhan Akobian 2.5-1.5 in the first round.

References

External links
 
 
 Esteban Alb Valderrama Quiceno chess games at 365Chess.com

1993 births
Living people
Colombian chess players
21st-century Colombian people